The Somniosidae are a family of sharks in the order Squaliformes, commonly known as sleeper sharks. The common name "sleeper shark" comes from their slow swimming, low activity level, and perceived non-aggressive nature.

Distribution and habitat
The Somniosidae can be found in:
Arctic to subantarctic waters
Shelves in cold waters
Continental and slopes
Temperate and tropical waters

Diet
Beaks recovered from the stomachs of sleeper sharks suggest they feed on colossal squid.

Genera and species
 Centroscymnus Barbosa du Bocage & Brito Capello, 1864
 Centroscymnus coelolepis Barbosa du Bocage & Brito Capello, 1864 (Portuguese dogfish)
 Centroscymnus owstonii Garman, 1906 (roughskin dogfish)
 Centroselachus Garman, 1913
 Centroselachus crepidater Barbosa du Bocage & Brito Capello, 1864 (longnose velvet dogfish)
 Scymnodalatias Garrick, 1956
 Scymnodalatias albicauda Taniuchi & Garrick, 1986 (whitetail dogfish)
 Scymnodalatias garricki Kukuyev & Konovalenko, 1988 (Azores dogfish)
 Scymnodalatias oligodon Kukuyev & Konovalenko, 1988 (sparsetooth dogfish)
 Scymnodalatias sherwoodi Archey, 1921 (Sherwood dogfish)
 Scymnodon Barbosa du Bocage & Brito Capello, 1864
 Scymnodon ichiharai Yano & S. Tanaka (II), 1984 (Japanese velvet dogfish)
 Scymnodon macracanthus Regan, 1906 (largespine velvet dogfish)
 Scymnodon plunketi Waite, 1910 (Plunket's shark)
 Scymnodon ringens Barbosa du Bocage & Brito Capello, 1864 (knifetooth dogfish)
 Somniosus Lesueur, 1818
 Somniosus antarcticus Whitley, 1939 (southern sleeper shark)
 Somniosus longus Tanaka, 1912 (frog shark)
 Somniosus microcephalus Bloch & J. G. Schneider, 1801 (Greenland shark)
 Somniosus pacificus Bigelow & Schroeder, 1944 (Pacific sleeper shark)
 Somniosus rostratus Risso, 1827 (little sleeper shark)
 Somniosus sp. A Not yet described (longnose sleeper shark)
 Zameus D. S. Jordan & Fowler, 1903
 Zameus squamulosus Günther, 1877 (velvet dogfish)

Hákarl

Greenland sharks of the family Somniosidae are hunted for food in Iceland. In modern times, many Greenlandic sharks used for hákarl production are purchased from fishing ships where the sharks were trapped in the fishing nets. The shark carcass is traditionally fermented in a shallow pit, with stones placed on top of the shark, allowing poisonous internal fluids, like urea and trimethylamine oxide, to be pressed and drained out of the body. The meat is then cured for several months, rendering it safe for human consumption.

References

 
Shark families
Taxa named by David Starr Jordan